Eucalyptus microcorys, commonly known as tallowwood, is a species of medium to tall tree that is endemic to eastern Australia. It has rough, fibrous or string bark on the trunk and branches, lance-shaped to egg-shaped adult leaves, flower buds in groups of seven or nine, white to lemon-yellow flowers and conical fruit. It grows in forests near the coast of Queensland and New South Wales.

Description
It has rough, fibrous or stringy brownish bark on the trunk and branches. The leaf veins are prominent, well-spaced and at an angle greater than 45° to the leaf mid-rib. Flowering occurs between August and January and the flowers are white to lemon-yellow.

Taxonomy and naming
Eucalyptus microcorys was first formally described in 1860 by Ferdinand von Mueller in Fragmenta Phytographiae Australiae from specimens collected by Hermann Beckler near the Hastings and Macleay Rivers. The specific epithet (microcorys) is from the ancient Greek micro- meaning "small" and corys meaning "helmet".

Distribution and habitat
Tallowwood mainly grows in tall open forest on fertile soil on slopes and ridges and in valleys. It is found from Fraser Island in Queensland, south to Cooranbong in New South Wales and as far inland as Toowoomba.

Gallery

References

microcorys
Myrtales of Australia
Trees of Australia
Flora of New South Wales
Flora of Queensland
Plants described in 1860
Taxa named by Ferdinand von Mueller